Verdy may refer to:

 Tokyo Verdy
 Violette Verdy (1933–2016), French ballerina